The names Asiatic leopard and Asian leopard refer to any of the following leopard (Panthera pardus) subspecies in Asia:
 Amur leopard (P. p. orientalis)
 Anatolian or Persian leopard (P. p. tulliana)
 Arabian leopard (P. p. nimr)
 Indian leopard (P. p. fusca)
 Indochinese leopard (P. p. delacouri)
 Javan leopard (P. p. melas)
 Sri Lankan leopard (P. p. kotiya)

Two other species are also found in Asia, though are completely different species unrelated to the above. They are:
 Snow leopard (P. uncia)
 Clouded leopard (Neofelis nebulosa)

Leopards
Mammal common names